Yosi, the Regretful Spy is an Argentine-Uruguayan thriller streaming television series created by Daniel Burman for Amazon Prime Video and based on the 2015 book Iosi, el espía arrepentido by authors Horacio Lutzky and Miriam Lewin. It revolves around an Argentine Federal Police agent who infiltrates a Jewish community to gather information, which was apparently used to carry out the terrorist attacks against the Israeli embassy in 1992 and the AMIA in 1994.

The series, which debuted on April 29, 2022, stars a cast of Argentines and Uruguayans actors. A month after its premiere, in May 2022 it was renewed for a second season. In November 2022, Yosi, the Regretful Spy won the Silver Condor Awards for Best Drama Series, and Bassani for Best Leading Actor in Drama.

Premise 
Yosi, the regretful spy follows José Pérez, an intelligence agent of the Argentine Federal Police, who is assigned to infiltrate a Jewish community, to gather information about the "Andinia Plan", which seeks to establish a Jewish state in Patagonia. This plan was later used to perpetrate two terrorist attacks on Argentine soil: the bombing on the Israeli embassy in 1992 –in which no culprits were determined–, and on the Argentine Israeli Mutual Association in 1994 –in which several accessories after the fact were convicted–.

Cast and characters

Main 

 Natalia Oreiro as Claudia, Yosi's superior and only contact, she is a controlling and anti-Semitic agent, who believes in the Andinia Plan and seeks to prevent it from being carried out in Argentina.
 Gustavo Bassani as José Pérez / Yosi, an anti-Semitic police intelligence agent who infiltrates a Jewish community.
 Alejandro Awada as Saúl Menajem, a businessman linked to finance and banking, who traffics arms
 Carla Quevedo as Eli, a committed young Jewish woman who is politically active and has a secret from the past that haunts her
 Minerva Casero as Dafne Menajem, Saúl's daughter and Yosi's romantic interest
 Juan Leyrado as Abraham Glusberg, the Jewish husband of José's mother
 Marco Antonio Caponi as Luis Garrido, José's friend and corrupt intelligence agent who conducts business outside the law.
 Daniel Kuzniecka as Aarón
 Matías Mayer as Víctor Kesselman, leader of the left-wing political group that Yosi joins.

Recurring 

 Mirella Pascual as Zuni
 César Troncoso as Castaño
 Damián Dreizik as Marcelo
 Carlos Belloso as Kadar

Guest 

 Roly Serrano as Minister Aquino
 Julián Ache Pérez Zinola as Jonás Kesselman
 Mercedes Morán as Mónica Raposo
 Danna Liberman as Silvina
 Miguel Di Lemme as Daniel Cruz
 Lucio Hernández as Salerno
 Víctor Wainbuch as Rabbi Straimel
 Fernando Miró as Prosecutor Castillo
 Roberto Suárez as Horacio Gutiérrez
 David Masajnik as Doctor Roitman

Episodes

Series 1 (2022)

Production

Development 
In February 2017, it was announced that the Argentine production company Oficina Burman had joined Mediapro to develop several projects to launch internationally, including the adaptation of the book Iosi, el espía arrepentido written by Horacio Lutzky and Miriam Lewin, and which tells the real story of an Argentine policeman who infiltrates a Jewish community. In January 2020, Daniel Burman and Sebastián Borensztein were confirmed as the directors of the series that would be made up of 8 episodes of 40–50 minutes each. On 7 April 2022, it was announced that the series would premiere on the 29th. On 26 May 2022, Amazon Prime Video renewed the show for a second series.

Casting 
On 17 May 2018, it was announced that Natalia Oreiro, Gustavo Bassani, Marco Antonio Caponi, Alejandro Awada, Juan Leyrado, Matías Mayer and Minerva Casero had joined the show's main cast. In January 2021, it was reported that Carla Quevedo had been cast. At the end of May 2022, it was reported that two Israeli actors Moran Rosenblatt and Itzik Cohen would join the cast of the series.

Filming 
Filming for the first series took place at several locations in Uruguay during 2021. Although the filming took place mainly in Montevideo, several towns in the Canelones Department, such as Progreso, Cerrillos, La Paz and Paso de Carrasco were also included.

Reception

Critical response 
Raúl Kollmann of Página 12 gave a positive review and wrote: "Iosi, el espía arrepentido makes visible what that time was and what the infiltrators of the Federal Police were. But above all because the chapters are exciting, with a huge production that includes beautiful images in the desert, good performances and a rhythm that has nothing to envy to the best series".

Awards and nominations

References

External links 

 Official website
 

Television series based on books
Television shows filmed in Uruguay
2022 Uruguayan television series debuts
2022 Argentine television series debuts
Spanish-language Amazon Prime Video original programming
Television series set in the 1980s
Television series set in the 1990s
Television series set in the 2000s